Benin competed at the 2010 Summer Youth Olympics, the inaugural Youth Olympic Games, held in Singapore from 14 August to 26 August 2010.

Athletics

Girls
Track and Road Events

Taekwondo

Wrestling

Freestyle

References

External links
Competitors List: Benin – Singapore 2010 official site

Oly
Nations at the 2010 Summer Youth Olympics
Benin at the Youth Olympics